Donetsk, formerly known as Aleksandrovka, Yuzivka (or Hughesovka), Stalin and Stalino (see also: cities' alternative names), is an industrial city in eastern Ukraine located on the Kalmius River in Donetsk Oblast. According to the 2001 census, Donetsk was the fifth-largest city in Ukraine.

Administratively, Donetsk has been the centre of Donetsk Oblast, while historically, it is the unofficial capital and largest city of the larger economic and cultural Donets Basin (Donbas) region. Donetsk is adjacent to another major city, Makiivka, and along with other surrounding cities forms a major urban sprawl and conurbation in the region. Donetsk has been a major economic, industrial and scientific centre of Ukraine with a high concentration of heavy industries and a skilled workforce. The density of heavy industries (predominantly steel production, chemical industry, and coal mining) determined the city's challenging ecological situation. In 2012, a UN report ranked Donetsk among the world's fastest depopulating cities.

The original settlement in the south of the European part of the Russian Empire was first mentioned as Aleksandrovka in 1779, during the reign of the Empress Catherine the Great. In 1869, the Welsh businessman John Hughes founded a steel plant and several coal mines in the region, and the town was named Hughesovka or Yuzovka (Юзовка) in recognition of his role ("Yuz" being a Russian-language approximation of Hughes). During Soviet times, the city's steel industry expanded. In 1924, Yuzovka was renamed Stalin. In 1929, Stalin was renamed Stalino, and in 1932, the city became the centre of the Donetsk region. Renamed Donetsk in 1961, the city today remains a centre for coal mining and for the steel industry.

Since April 2014, Donetsk and its surrounding areas have been one of the major sites of fighting in the ongoing Russo-Ukrainian War, as pro-Russian separatist forces battle against Ukrainian military forces for control of the city and surrounding areas. Throughout the war, the city of Donetsk has been administered by the pro-Russian separatist forces as the center of the Donetsk People's Republic (DPR), with outlying territories of the Donetsk region divided between the two sides. Donetsk International Airport became the epicenter of the war in 2014 with almost a year-long battle.

, Russia has full control of the city, with Ukrainian and Russian forces still engaging in combat adjacent the city.

History

Foundation
The existence of Aleksandrovskaya Cossack Sloboda in its place is attested by 1779, with the  eventually being opened there.

The city of Donetsk was founded in 1869 by Welsh businessman John Hughes, who operated a steel plant and several coal mines at Aleksandrovka. The worker's settlement at the plant merged with Aleksandrovka and the place was named Yuzovo, later Yuzovka, after Hughes. In its early period, it received immigrants from Wales, especially from the town of Merthyr Tydfil. By the beginning of the 20th century, Yuzovka had approximately 50,000 inhabitants, and attained the status of a city in 1917. The main district of Yuzovka is named English Colony, and the British origin of the city is reflected in its layout and architecture.

Soviet Union

When the Russian Civil War broke out, Yuzovka was part of the Donetsk-Krivoy Rog Soviet Republic from its declaration of independence on 12 February 1918. The Republic was disbanded at the 2nd All-Ukrainian Congress of Soviets on 20 March 1918, when the independence of the Ukrainian Soviet Republic was declared. It failed to achieve recognition, either internationally or by the Russian SFSR, and was abolished under the Treaty of Brest-Litovsk.

In 1924, under Soviet rule, the city's name was changed to Stalin. In that year, the city's population totaled 63,708, and in the next year, 80,085. In 1929–31 the city's name was changed to Stalino. The city did not have a drinking water system until 1931, when a  system was laid underground. In July 1933, the city became the administrative center of the Donetsian Oblast of the Ukrainian SSR. In 1933, the first  sewer system was installed, and the use of gas began the next year. Some sources state that the city was briefly called Trotsk—after Leon Trotsky—for a few months in late 1923.

At the start of World War II, the population of Stalino was 507,000. After the war, the population was 175,000. The invasion by Nazi Germany almost completely destroyed the city. It was occupied by German and Italian forces as part of the Reichskommissariat Ukraine between 16 October 1941 and 5 September 1943.  It was mostly rebuilt on a large scale after the war.

In 1945, young men and women aged 17 to 35, from the Danube Swabian (Schwowe) communities of Yugoslavia, Hungary and Romania (the Batschka and Banat), were forcibly sent to Russia as Allied "war reparations", being put to work as slave labour to rebuild Stalino and to work in its mines. The conditions were so poor that many died from disease and malnutrition.

During Nikita Khrushchev's second wave of destalinization in November 1961, the city was renamed Donetsk, after the Seversky Donets River, a tributary of the Don in order to distance it from the former leader Joseph Stalin.

In 1965, the Donetsk Academy of Sciences was established as part of the Academy of Sciences of the Ukrainian SSR.

Independent Ukraine
After the declaration of independence made by the Ukrainian parliament on 24 August 1991 the 1991 Ukrainian independence referendum was held on 1 December 1991. In this referendum 83.90% of Donetsk's voters voted in favour of independence.

After experiencing a tough time in the 1990s, when it was the center of gang wars for control over industrial enterprises, Donetsk modernised quickly, largely under the influence of big companies.

In 1994 a consultaitve referendum was held in Donetsk Oblast and Luhansk Oblast, with around 90% supporting recognition of Russian as an official language alongside Ukrainian, and for Russian to be an official language on a regional level.

In the 1990s and the 2000s, hundreds were killed in coal mine collapses in Donetsk and the region. These included the 2008 Ukraine coal mine collapse, the 2007 Zasyadko mine disaster, and the 2015 Zasyadko mine disaster. Ukraine has had many mining accidents since the collapse of the Soviet Union in 1991, with one reason cited as the linking of miners' pay to production, which is an incentive to ignore safety procedures that slow production.

In a summit in Moscow in 2008, Donetsk was recognised as the best city in the Commonwealth of Independent States for its implemented development strategies; in 2012 and 2013 Donetsk was recognised as the best place for business in Ukraine.

Whilst getting praise for its business potential in 2009, Donetsk also received criticism for the strong mafia connection of its growing oligarchy, and for an increasing poverty rate. Some analysts warned of a long-term collapse of the Donetsk economy; and that it could share Detroit's gloomy fate, due to its failure to combat crime and poverty.

Donetsk People's Republic and Russia (2014–present)
The police did not offer resistance. Later in the week the authorities of Donetsk disallowed a referendum on the status of the region and the police retook the Donetsk OSA building. Donetsk became one of the centers of the 2014 pro-Russian conflict in Ukraine.

On 7 April 2014, pro-Russian activists seized control of Donetsk OSA and declared the "Donetsk People's Republic", asking for Russian intervention.

On 11 May 2014, a Donetsk status referendum, 2014 was held in Donetsk in which voters could choose political independence. It was stated by the head of the self-proclaimed Donetsk People's Republic election commission, Roman Lyagin, that almost 90 percent of those who voted in the Donetsk Region endorsed political independence from Kyiv. Ukraine does not recognize the referendum, while the EU and US stated that the polls were illegal.

Heavy shelling by the Ukrainian Army and paramilitary units have caused civilian fatalities in Donetsk. Human Rights Watch has called on both warring factions to cease using the unguided BM-21 Grad missiles in populated areas, and has said the use of these weapons systems was a violation of international humanitarian laws and could constitute a war crime. It also called on the insurgents to avoid their deployment in densely populated areas.

The 2015 IIHF World Championship Division I, Group A was scheduled for 18 to 24 April 2015 in Donetsk, but Ukraine withdrew as hosts due to the ongoing conflict in the country. Instead of Donetsk, the tournament was organized in Kraków, Poland. Eventually, Ukraine co-organized 2017 IIHF World Championship Division I, again Group A, but in its capital, Kyiv.

On 30 September 2022, Putin signed a decree claiming to annex four regions, including Donetsk, as part of Russia. This annexation has been seen by the global community as a breach of international law.

Geography 

Donetsk lies in the steppe landscape, surrounded by scattered woodland, hills, spoil tips, rivers and lakes. The northern outskirts are mainly used for agriculture. A wide belt of farmlands surrounds the city.

There are 2 nearby reservoirs: Nyzhnekalmius (60 ha), and the "Donetsk Sea" (206 ha). 5 rivers flow through the city, including the Kalmius, Asmolivka (13 km), Cherepashkyna (23 km), Skomoroshka and Bakhmutka. The city also contains a total of 125 spoil tips.

Climate 
Donetsk's climate is moderate warm summer continental (Köppen: Dfb). The average number of rainfall per year totals 162 days and up to 556 millimetres per year.

Government and administrative divisions 

Since 7 April 2014 Donetsk is de facto governed by the Donetsk People's Republic as its capital city. The Donetsk People's Republic is not recognized internationally and all UN member states recognize the city as Ukrainian. South Ossetia, another state with limited recognition, recognizes the Donetsk People's Republic as a sovereign entity and Donetsk as its capital.

The territory of Donetsk is divided into 9 administrative raions (districts), whose local government is administered by raion councils, which are subordinate to the Donetsk City Council.

Demographics 
See article: Russians in Ukraine

Donetsk had a population of over 985,000 inhabitants in 2009 and over 1,566,000 inhabitants in the metropolitan area in 2004. It was the fifth-largest city in Ukraine.

According to the 2001 census, the Donetsk Oblast is inhabited by members of more than 130 ethnic groups. The Ukrainian ethnicity is 56.9% of the population (2,744,100 people); the Russian ethnicity is 38.2% of the population (1,844,400 people). The native language of 74.9% of the population of the Donetsk region is Russian, compared with 24.1% Ukrainian. 58.7% of people of Ukrainian ethnicity considered Russian to be their native language.

In 1989 there were no Ukrainian language schools in Donetsk.

The structure of the Donetsk City Municipality by ethnicity in 2001 is as follows:

 Russians: 493,392 people, 48.15%
 Ukrainians: 478,041 people, 46.65%
 Belarusians: 11,769 people, 1.15%
 Pontic Greeks (including Caucasus Greeks): 10,180 people, 0.99%
 Jews: 5,087 people, 0.50%
 Tatars: 4,987 people, 0.49%
 Armenians: 4,050 people, 0.40%
 Azerbaijanis: 2,098 people, 0.20%
 Georgians: 2,073 people, 0.20%
 Other: 13,001 people, 1.27%

Total: 1,024,678 people, 100.00%
In 1991 one-third of the population identified as Russian, one-third as Ukrainian while the majority of the rest declared themselves Slavs. Smaller minorities include in particular ethnic groups from the South Caucasus and northeast Anatolia region, including Armenians, Azerbaijanis, Georgians, and Pontic Greeks (including those defined as Caucasus Greeks).

Native language of the population of the city of Donetsk as of the Ukrainian Census of 2001:
Russian  87.8%
Ukrainian  11.1%
Armenian  0.1%
Belarusian  0.1%

Economy 

Donetsk and the surrounding territories are heavily urbanised and agglomerated into conurbation. The workforce is heavily involved with heavy industry, especially coal mining. The city is an important center of heavy industry and coal mines in the Donets Basin (Donbas). Directly under the city lie coal mines, which have recently seen an increase in mining accidents, the most recent accident being at the Zasyadko mine, which killed over 100 workers.

Donetsk's economy consists of about 200 industrial organizations that have a total production output of more than 120 billion rubles per year and more than 20,000 medium-small sized organizations. The city's coal mining industry comprises 17 coal mines and two concentrating mills; the metallurgy industry comprises 5 large metallurgical plants located throughout the city; the engineering market comprises 67 organizations, and the food industry — 32 organizations.

After the fall of the Soviet Union, Donetsk and other neighboring cities of the Donbas suffered heavily, as many factories were closed down and many inhabitants lost their jobs.

The city also houses the "Donetsk" special economic zone. Donetsk currently has nine sister cities. The German city of Magdeburg had economic partnerships with Donetsk during 1962–1996.

In 2012, Donetsk was rated the best city for business in Ukraine by Forbes. Donetsk topped the rating in five indicators: human capital, the purchasing power of citizens, investment situation, economic stability, as well as infrastructure and comfort.

The shopping areas in the city include the enclosed shopping mall Donetsk City.

Sports 
Donetsk is a large sports center, has a developed infrastructure, and has repeatedly held international competitions – Davis Cup, UEFA Champions League. Representatives of the city are state leaders sports such as football, hockey, basketball, boxing, tennis, athletics and others.

The most popular sport in Donetsk is football. Donetsk is home to two major professional football clubs: Shakhtar Donetsk, which played at the Donbas Arena prior to 2014 but now plays at NSC Olimpiyskiy, and FC Olimpik Donetsk, which currently plays in Chernihiv Stadium. Until 2021, both played in the Ukraine Premier League, but in 2021, Olimpik was relegated to the Ukrainian First League. Shakhtar Donetsk won the Ukrainian Championship and Ukrainian Cup multiple times, and in 2009 they became the second team from Ukraine (after FC Dynamo Kyiv) to win a European competition, the UEFA Cup. Donetsk was also home to the women's football club WFC Donchanka, one of the most successful clubs in the history of the Ukrainian Women's League, but it ceased operations in 2014.

Donetsk is home to the football stadium Donbas Arena, which was opened in 2009. It became the first stadium in Eastern Europe designed and constructed according to the UEFA standards for stadiums of "Elite" category. When the joint bid for the UEFA Euro 2012 was won by Poland and Ukraine, Donetsk's Donbas Arena was chosen as the location for three Group D matches, one quarter-final match, and one semi-final match. The RSK Olimpiyskyi Stadium was chosen as a reserve stadium.

Donetsk, together with the nearby Mariupol, were the host towns of the 2009 UEFA European Under-19 Championship. The stadiums hosting the event on behalf of Donetsk were RSC Olimpiyskiy (which hosted the final) and the Metalurh Stadium.

Donetsk is home to the ice hockey club HC Donbass, playing at the Druzhba Arena since 2011 (but discontinuing operations is 2014 and then moving to Druzhkivka in 2015), which won the 2011 Ukrainian Hockey Championship, and which is the only elite level team in the country. After playing a single season in the Russian Major League, the club upgraded its arena to Kontinental Hockey League regulations, and joined the league in 2012. When moving to the KHL, the club created a local farm club to play in the Ukrainian Championship under the name HC Donbass-2, which won the 2012 and 2013 national titles. In 2013 Donetsk was hosting the 2012–13 IIHF Continental Cup ice hockey Super Final, which HC Donbass won, and the 2013 IIHF World Championship Division I – Group B, where Ukraine finished 1st and earned promotion to Group A (both were hosted at the Druzhba Arena). After the team resumed operations in 2015, it withdrew from the KHL, ultimately ending up in the Ukrainian Hockey League, where it has won four of the last five championships.

Donetsk was also home to the basketball club BC Donetsk, which played in the Ukrainian Basketball Super League, and won the 2012 champion title. The club played at the Druzhba Arena, and Donetsk had been chosen as one of the 6 Ukrainian cities to host the FIBA EuroBasket 2015. However, the club discontinued play after 2014 due to the ongoing war, and the 2015 FIBA tournament had to be moved out of the country.

The city used to be the home of few notable at the time yet now defunct clubs. The MFC Shakhtar Donetsk club won the Ukrainian futsal championship five times, but was dissolved in January 2011 midway through the season due to financial problems (at the time – the most titled club in Ukraine). One of the top Soviet volleyball teams at the time, VC Shakhtar Donetsk, who were the last team to win the Soviet Volleyball Championship, in 1992. The team also won the first two championships in the independent Ukraine league, in 1992 and 1993 (the 1992 Ukraine championship was held in Donetsk), and won the Ukraine Cup in 1993, but after having financial issues, the club was relegated in 1997, and after one season in the second tear it was shut down.

Donetsk hosted the USSR Tennis Championship in 1978, 1979 and 1980, and hosted some tennis matches of the 2005 Davis Cup. Donetsk was home to the Alexander Kolyaskin Memorial, which was held between 2002–2008 and part of the ATP Challenger Series, and Donetsk is the home of the female Viccourt Cup, which is classified as an ITF Women's Circuit and started in 2012.

Donetsk was always an important athletics centre, and hosted various events. Donetsk was one of the host towns for the 1978 and 1980 Soviet Athletics Championships, and was the sole host town of the event in 1984. Donetsk also hosted the 1977 European Athletics Junior Championships. The stadium used for those athletics events was the RSC Olimpiyskiy (at the time called RSC Lokomotiv).

Among the different track and field sports, Donetsk especially has a big name in pole vaulting. Serhii Bubka, regarded by many as the greatest pole vaulter in history, grew up in the city, and also started in 1992 an annual pole vaulting event in Donetsk, called Pole Vault Stars. Bubka himself set the world indoor record at the event three times (1990, 1991, 1993). His indoor world pole vault record of 6.15m, set in the Donetsk Olympic Stadium on 21 February 1993, was not broken until 2014. The Russian female pole vaulter Yelena Isinbayeva set a new world record at the event every year between 2004 and 2009.

The 2015 IIHF World Championship Division I ice hockey tournament had been scheduled for 18 to 24 April 2015 in Donetsk but was later moved to Kraków, Poland due to the ongoing war.

Professional sports teams 
The following is a list of existing professional sports teams, and notable (title-winning) defunct clubs. None of the clubs currently play in the city due to the Russo-Ukrainian War.

Culture

Attractions

First Line Avenue (Artema Street) 

First Line Avenue, also known as Artema Street, is considered to be the main part of Donetsk. It generally functions as the foremost place to start for any tourist trip around the city. The street hosts a mix of new and old architecture together with small parks, hotels, shopping centers and restaurants. Noteworthy sites include Lenin Square, the Opera & Ballet Theatre, Monument to Coalminers and Donetsk Drama Theatre.

Statue of Artyom (Fyodor Sergeyev) 
This six meter tall statue on Artema Street is a tribute to Soviet politician Fyodor Sergeyev.

Donetsk Opera and Ballet Theatre 
Built in 1936, the Donetsk State Academic Opera and Ballet Theatre has been home to the Donetsk Ballet company since 1946.

Donbass Palace 

This 5-star hotel in the center of Donetsk is the only ex-Ukrainian hotel to join The Leading Hotels of The World and was Ukraine's leading business hotel according to the World Travel Awards Association. It was built in 1938 by order of Shuvalova and Rechanikov. During the Nazi occupation of Donetsk, the Gestapo occupied the hotel as a headquarters; the building was partially destroyed during the war. The hotel was reopened after the reconstruction in 2004.

Pushkin Boulevard 

The Mertsalov Palm sculpture is also located on Pushkin Boulevard. Originally created for an exhibition in 1896 by Aleksei Mertsalov, a local blacksmith, out of a single rail, it was meant to represent the skills and power of the heavy industry in Czarist Russia.

Monument to John Hughes 
This 2001 statue located in front of Donetsk National Technical University honors the work of Welsh city founder John James Hughes, who built the city's Yuzovka Steel Plant which gave Donetsk its industrial history.

Forged Figures Park 
Forged Figures Park was opened in 2001. The International Smithcraft Festival takes place in the park every year. Some prize-winning works are gifted to the city and remain in the park, periodically increasing the number of sculptures.

Aqua park 
Donetsk Aquapark "Royal Marine" was opened in Scherbakova Park in late 2012. The  aqua park, one of the largest indoor water parks in the world, was built by Canadian company OpenAire, Inc.

Architecture 

Donetsk, at the time Yuzovka, was divided into two parts: north and south. In the southern part were the city's factories, railway stations, telegraph buildings, hospitals and schools. Not far from the factories was the English colony where the engineers and the management lived. After the construction of the residence of John Hughes and the various complexes for the foreign workers, the city's southern portion was constructed mainly in the English style.

These buildings used rectangular and triangular shaped façades, green rooftops, large windows, which occupied a large portion of the building, and balconies. In this part of the town, the streets were large and had pavements. A major influence on the formation of architecture in Donetsk was the official architect of a Novorossiya company — Moldingauyer. Preserved buildings of the southern part of Yuzovka consisted of the residences of John Hughes (1891, partially preserved), Bolfur (1889) and Bosse.

In the northern part of Yuzovka, Novyi Svet, lived traders, craftsmen and bureaucrats. Here were located the market hall, the police headquarters and the Cathedral of the Transfiguration of Jesus. The central street of Novyi Svet and the neighbouring streets were mainly edged by one- or two-story residential buildings, as well as markets, restaurants, hotels, offices and banks. A famous preserved building in the northern part of Yuzovka was the Hotel Great Britain.

The first general plan of Stalino was made in 1932 in Odessa by the architect P. Golovchenko. In 1937, the project was partly reworked. These projects were the first in the city's construction bureau's history.

A large portion of the city's buildings from the second half of the 20th century were designed by the architect Pavel Vigdergauz, which was given the Government award of the USSR for architecture in the city of Donetsk in 1978.

Religion 

Donetsk's residents belong to religious traditions including the Eastern Orthodox Church Eastern Catholic Churches, Protestantism, and the Roman Catholic Church, as well as Islam and Judaism. The religious body with the most members is the Ukrainian Orthodox Church (Moscow Patriarchate) and Ukrainian Orthodox Church of the Kyivan Patriarchate.

In 2014, a leaflet carrying the signature of the "Chairman of Donetsk's temporary government Denis Pushilin" was distributed to Jews on the festival of Passover. The leaflet asked Donetsk's Jewish citizens to register themselves, their property, and their families to the pro-Russian authorities. The leaflet claimed that failure to comply with its demands would result in the revocation of citizenship and confiscation of property. The leaflet prompted confusion and fear among Donetsk's Jewish population, who saw echoes of the Holocaust in the leaflet. Pushilin denied any connection with the leaflets and called them a provocation.

Media 
Five television stations operate within Donetsk:

 TRK Ukraina
 KRT, Kyivska Rus'
 First Municipal
 Kanal 27
 TRK Donbass

In Donetsk, there is the 360-metre tall TV tower, one of the tallest structures in the city, completed in 1992.

Notable people 

The citizens of Donetsk are commonly called Donchyani. The following is a list of famous people who were born or brought up in the city:

 Rinat Akhmetov (born 1966), a Ukrainian billionaire businessman
 Emma Andijewska (born 1931), a modern Ukrainian poet, writer and painter
 Alexander Anoprienko (born 1957), Professor of Computer Engineering in Donetsk
 Zalman Aran (1899–1970) a Zionist activist, educator and Israeli government minister
 Serhiy Arbuzov (born 1976), head of Ukrainian Bank, 2010-2012
 Mykola Azarov (born 1947), Prime Minister of Ukraine, 2010 to 2014
 Fyodor Berezin (born 1960), a Russian science fiction writer and active supporter of the Donetsk People's Republic
 Volodymyr Biletskyy (born 1950), a Ukrainian mining engineer and scientist
 Viktor Burduk (born 1957), artist and blacksmith
 Vera Filatova (born 1982), a Ukrainian British actress
 Anatoly Fomenko (born 1945), mathematician, academic and promoter of New Chronology
 Dmytro Gnap (born 1977), journalist, investigates corruption
 Yuri Kara (born 1954), Russian film director, screenwriter and producer
 Yevgeny Khaldei (1917–1997), Red Army naval officer and Soviet photographer
 Nikita Khrushchev (1894–1971), Premier of the Soviet Union 1953–1964, grew up in Yuzovka
 Iya Kiva (born 1984), Ukrainian poet, translator, journalist, critic
 Valeriy Konovalyuk (born 1966), economist and businessman
 Anna Korsun (born 1986), Ukrainian singer, pianist, organist, conductor and composer 
 Tatyana Kravchenko (born 1953), Soviet and Russian actress
 Mikhail Krichevsky (1897–2008), WW I veteran who fought for the Russian Empire
 Alexander Kuzemsky (born 1944), Soviet and Russian theoretical physicist
 Make Me Famous (2010–2012), English language Metalcore band
 Oleksiy Matsuka (born 1983), Ukrainian journalistand corruption investigator 
 Siouzana Melikián (born 1986), Russian-Mexican actress
 Vadym Pysarev (born 1965), Ukrainian dancer and art Director
 Aleksandr Revva (born 1974), stand-up comedian, TV host and voice actor 
 Volodymyr Rybak (born 1946), Mayor of Donetsk and Chairman of the Verkhovna Rada
 Vladislav Rusanov (born 1966), Russian-language science fiction writer
 Denis Stoff (born 1992), Ukrainian musician, vocalist for Asking Alexandria
 Natan Sharansky (born 1948), former anticommunist, Zionist, Israeli politician and writer
 Ihor Sorkin (born 1967), former head of the Ukrainian National Bank
 Anatoliy Solovianenko (1932–1999), Soviet operatic tenor
 Oleg Stefan (born 1959), Soviet and Russian actor
 Vasyl Stus (1938–1985), Ukrainian poet and publicist and member of the dissident movement
 Petro Symonenko (born 1952), head of the Communist Party of Ukraine
 Kirill Tolpygo (1916–1994), Soviet physicist worked on condensed matter theory
 Marina Tsvigun (born 1960), religious sect leader, new age movement
 Viktor Yanukovych (born 1950), former president of Ukraine; deposed in 2014
 Pavlo Vigderhaus (1925-2013), Soviet architect, Monument to a Miner creator
 Vladimir Zakharov (1901–1956), Soviet composer and choir conductor

Sport 
 Polina Astakhova (1936–2005), Ukrainian gymnast, multiple Olympic medallist
 Serhii Bubka (born 1963), Ukrainian pole vault athlete; gold medallist 1988 Summer Olympics
 Yuriy Dehteryov (born 1948), goalkeeper, 321 caps with Shakhtar Donetsk and 17 with the USSR
 Yuriy Gavrilov (1967-2021), volleyball player, Olympic gold medallist
 Julia Glushko (born 1990), Israeli tennis player
 Aleksandr Lebziak (born 1969), Russian boxer
 Natalya Mammadova (born 1984), Azeri volleyball player
 Evgenij Miroshnichenko (born 1978), Ukrainian chess player
 Ilya Mate (born 1956), Soviet Ukrainian freestyle wrestler, gold medal at the 1980 Summer Olympics
 Oleksiy Pecherov (born 1985), a Ukrainian basketball player
 Lilia Podkopayeva (born 1978), a Ukrainian gymnast, and the 1996 Olympic All Around Champion
 Serhii Rebrov (born 1974), footballer with 425 club caps and 75 for Ukraine
 Viktor Smyrnov (born 1986), Paralympic swimmer
 Viktor Sidyak (born 1943), fencing, first Soviet individual sabre Olympic gold medal in Munich 1972
 Nadiya Tkachenko (born 1948), Olympic-gold winning pentathlete
 Oleg Tverdovsky (born 1976), ice hockey player
 Alexander Yagubkin (1961–2013), 1982 World heavyweight amateur boxing champion
 Oleg Vernyayev (born 1993), Gymnast, Olympic gold medallist

Museums 

Donetsk is home to about 140 museums. Among them, two large regional museums – Donetsk Region History Museum and Donetsk Regional Art Museum.

Donetsk Region History Museum reveals the city's true identity and covers to the entire local community, diverse as it is. Set up in 1924, it offers an extensive expo with 120,000 exhibits: from archeological findings dating back to pre-historic times to the founding of the city by John Hughes, development of industry and coal mining, World War II and the Soviet times. On 21 August 2014, the mayor of Donetsk reported that the roof and walls of the Donetsk Regional History Museum had been destroyed by shellfire early that morning.

FC Shaktar Museum was opened in 2010. This museum was the first Ukrainian museum to be nominated for a European Museum of the Year Award.

Transport

Local transport 

The main forms of transport within Donetsk are: trams, electric trolley buses, buses and marshrutkas (private minibuses). The city's public transport system is controlled by the united Dongorpastrans municipal company. The city has 12 tram lines (~130 km), 17 trolley bus lines (~188 km), and about 115 bus lines. Both the tram and trolley bus systems in the city are served by 2 depots each. Another method of transport within the city is taxicab service, of which there are 32 in Donetsk.

The city also contains autostations located within the city and its suburbs: autostation Yuzhny (South), which serves mainly transport lines to the south, hence its name; autostation Tsentr (Centre), which serves transport in the direction of Marinka and Vuhledar as well as intercity transport; the autostation Krytyi rynok (Indoor market), which serves mainly transport in the north and east directions; and the autostation Putilovsky, which serves mainly the north and northwest transport directions.

The construction of the metro system in the city, begun in 1992, was recently abandoned due to the lack of funding. No lines or stations have been finished.

Railways 

Donetsk's main railway station, which serves about 7 million passengers annually, is located in the northern part of the city. There is a museum near the main station, dealing with the history of the region's railways. Other railway stations are: Rutchenkovo, located in the Kyivskyi Raion; Mandrykino (Petrovskyi Raion), and Mushketovo (Budionivskyi Raion). Some passenger trains avoid Donetsk station and serve the Yasynuvata station, located outside the city limits. Although not used for regular transport, the city also has a children's railway. As of September 2009, a new railway terminal facility to comply with UEFA requirements (since Donetsk was one of the host cities for UEFA EURO 2012) was planned.

The Donetsk Oblast was an important transport hub in Ukraine, so was its centre Donetsk. The Donetsk Railways, based in Donetsk, is the largest railway division in the Republic. It serves the farming and industrial businesses of the area, and the populations of the Donetsk and Lugansk Republics and parts of the Dnipropetrovsk, Zaporizhzhia and Kharkiv oblasts.

Road transport 
The  highway, part of the International E-road network, runs through the city en route to Rostov-on-Don in Russia.

In addition, another international road runs through the city: the M 04. Also, three national Ukrainian roads (N 15, N 20, and N 21) pass through the city.

The construction of the fourth stage of a circular road bypassing Donetsk was to be completed in 2014.

Air travel 
In addition to public and rail transport, Donetsk used to have an international airport. It was constructed during the early 1940s and early 1950s.  It was rebuilt in 1973 and again from 2011 to 2012. Because of fighting the airport has been closed as of 26 May 2014 and the airport has since then largely been destroyed. The airspace above Donetsk has also been closed since the MH17 disaster.

Education 

Donetsk has several universities, which include five state universities, 11 institutes, three academies, 14 technicums, five private universities, and six colleges.

The most important and prominent educational institutions include Donetsk National Technical University, founded in 1921 ("Donetsk Polytechnical Institute" in 1960–1993), as well as the Donetsk National University which was founded in 1937. The National Technical University held close contacts with the university in Magdeburg. Since 1970, more than 100 students from Germany (East Germany) have completed their higher education at either one of the two main universities in Donetsk. Donetsk is also the home of the Donetsk National Medical University, which was founded in 1930 and became one of the largest medical universities in the Soviet Union. There are also several scientific research institutes and an Islamic University within Donetsk.

Donetsk is also the home of the Prokofiev Donetsk State Music Academy, a music conservatory founded in 1960.

Twinnings 

Donetsk participates in international town twinning schemes to foster good international relations. Partners include:

 Baku, Azerbaijan (2009)
 Bochum, Germany (1987)
 Charleroi, Belgium
 Katowice, Poland
 Kutaisi, Georgia
 Matagalpa, Nicaragua (2004)
 Moscow, Russia
 Pittsburgh, United States
 Rostov-on-Don, Russia
 Sheffield, United Kingdom
 Taranto, Italy (1984)
 Vilnius, Lithuania

See also

References

Sources

External links 

General
 donetsk.org.ua — Donetsk city administration website 
 stroit.dn.ua  — Construction site of Donetsk
  partner.donetsk.ua — Informational portal about Donetsk
 Official site of the Donetsk international airport
 Shakhtar Donetsk official website of the Shakhtar football team 
 dntsk.net — old and recent photos of Donetsk 

Historical
 geocities.com — History of Donetsk and the story of the founder John Hughes
 bfcollection.net — Historic images of Donetsk
 alldonetsk.info – The history of the city of Donetsk
  - Language Sandarmokh of Donetchyna, Mariya Oliynyk (UKR)

Maps
 citylife.donetsk.ua — City map in English language for foreigners
 maps.google.com — Google Maps satellite view of Donetsk
 wikimapia.org — Wikimapia view of Donetsk
 gorod.dn.ua — City map browsable and searchable by address

 
Cities in Donetsk Oblast
Special economic zones
Populated places established in 1869
Mining cities and regions in Ukraine
Articles containing video clips
Cities of regional significance in Ukraine
Populated places established in the Russian Empire
1869 establishments in the Russian Empire
City name changes in Ukraine
Former Soviet toponymy in Ukraine
Oblast centers in Ukraine
Bakhmutsky Uyezd
De-Stalinization
Territorial disputes of Ukraine
Donetsk Raion